The Pyramids of Meroë are part of the larger group of Nubian pyramids, built at the time of the Kushite Kingdom over a period close to a millennium.  Near Meroë, three royal cemeteries were constructed:
 South Cemetery features nine royal pyramids. Four of the pyramids belonged to Kings and five belonged to queens. One hundred and ninety-five other tombs complete the cemetery.
 North cemetery contains forty-one royal pyramids. Thirty belonged to kings, six to queens and five to other royals. The cemetery has three more non-royal tombs for a total of forty-four.
 West cemetery is a non-royal site. It contains some one hundred and thirteen tombs.

On 8 September 2020, the pyramids were threatened for the first time by floods.

Southern Cemetery at Begarawiyah
The southern cemetery is the burial place of the Meroitic side of the royal family from ca 720 – 300 BCE. Towards the end the cemetery became the main royal burial site for the Kings of Meroë. This cemetery contains several pyramids:
 Beg.S 1 –  Queen's pyramid (anonymous)
 Beg.S 2 – Queen's pyramid (anonymous)
 Beg.S 3 – Queen's pyramid (anonymous)
 Beg.S 4 – King's sister, King's Mother, Kenreth = Saleran? (or Saluwa?).
 Beg.S 5 – King Amanislo
 Beg.S 6 – King Arqamani or King Khnum-ib-re(?)
 Beg.S 9 – Queen's pyramid (anonymous)
 Beg.S 10 – King Kalka 
 Beg.S 20 – Prince Weteriken (?), son of Amaniastabarqa or Siaspiqa
 Beg.S 85 – Princess Mernua, contemp. King Anlamani – Aspelta
 Beg.S 500 – Prince Kariben, son of King Siaspiqa or King Nasakhma
 Beg.S 503 – Queen Khennuwa, approximately time of Nastasen

North Cemetery at Begarawiyah
After the southern cemetery was full, the burials continued in the north. This site contains the royal burials of the Kings and Queens of Meroë from ca 300 BCE to about 350 CE. The northern cemetery contains many royal pyramids:

 Beg. N1 – Queen Amanitore
 Beg. N2 – King Amanikhabale
 Beg. N3 – Queen's Pyramid (unidentified)
 Beg. N4 – King Amantekha
 Beg. N5 – Prince Arikhankharer, son of Amanitore
 Beg. N6 – Queen Amanishakheto
 Beg. N7 – King Arqamani (Merqetek) 
 Beg. N8 – Nahirqa(?) (Nayakhensan-mery-Isis ?).
 Beg. N9 – King Tabirqo (= Adikhalamani ?) 
 Beg. N10 – King Shorkaror or Arikhankharer
 Beg. N11 – Queen Shanakdakhete
 Beg. N12 – King's Pyramid (unidentified)
 Beg. N13 – King Naqyrjinsan
 Beg. N14 – King Teriteqas
 Beg. N15 – King Pisakar
 Beg. N16 – King Amanitaraqide
 Beg. N17 – King Amanitenmemide, Nebmaatre I
 Beg. N18 – Queen Amanikhatashan
 Beg. N19 – King Tarekeniwal
 Beg. N20 – King Tanyidamani
 Beg. N21 – Queen Amanirenas
 Beg. N22 – King Natakamani
 Beg. N24 – King Yesbokheamani
 Beg. N25 – Queen's Pyramid (unidentified)
 Beg. N26 – Queen's Pyramid (unidentified)
 Beg. N27 – King Maleqorobar
 Beg. N28 – King Teqorideamani
 Beg. N29 – King Takideamani
 Beg. N30 – King Aritenyesbokhe
 Beg. N32 – King Amanikhalika
 Beg. N34 – King Tamelerdeamani
 Beg. N35 – Maniterara(ze), Teraramani.
 Beg. N36 – King Aryesbokhe
 Beg. N37 – King Amanikhareqerem
 Beg. N38 – King Teritedakhatey
 Beg. N40 – King Teritnide
 Beg. N41 – King Adeqetali
 Beg. N51 – King's Pyramid (unidentified)
 Beg. N52 – Unknown
 Beg. N53 – King Arnekhamani
 Beg. N55 – Unknown
 Beg. N56 – Prince Arikakahtani, son of Amanitore

Treasures and artifacts of the North Cemetery
Numerous treasures were discovered in the pyramids since the 19th century.

West Cemetery at Begarawiyah

 Beg. W14 – Nasapanasap 
 Beg. W18 – Taktidamani 
 Beg. W19 – Tedeqen 
 Beg. W105 – Amanipilde 
 Beg. W113 – King Mashadeakhel
 Beg. W342 – Atedekey

See also
 Nubian pyramids
 El-Kurru pyramids
 Jebel Barkal pyramids
 Sedeinga pyramids
 Nuri pyramids

References

Archaeological sites in Sudan
Pyramids in Sudan
Kingdom of Kush